An Internet outage or Internet blackout or Internet shutdown is the complete or partial failure of the internet services. It can occur due to censorship, cyberattacks, disasters, police or security services actions or errors.

Disruptions of submarine communications cables may cause blackouts or slowdowns to large areas. Countries with a less developed Internet infrastructure are more vulnerable due to small numbers of high-capacity links.

A line of research finds that the Internet with it having a "hub-like" core structure that makes it robust to random losses of nodes but also fragile to targeted attacks on key components − the highly connected nodes or "hubs".

Types

Government blackout 

A government internet blackout is the deliberate shut down of civilian internet access by a government for a small area or many large areas of its country. Such a shut down is typically used as a means of information control in a brief period of upheaval or transition. It can impede the ability of protesters or insurgent forces to mobilize and organize. It also serves to prevent real-time information access for foreign people or entities. Reactions from leaders, journalists, observers and others in foreign countries can be delayed.

Military blackout 
The temporary disconnection of civilian internet access by military forces is an important aspect of information warfare. This tactic is common today, and is often used in concert with a ground invasion by conventional forces. It could also be used in advance of an airstrike campaign.

Weather or natural disaster 
Extreme weather events and natural disasters can lead to internet outages by either directly destroying local ICT infrastructure or indirectly damaging the local electricity grid. The Monash IP Observatory and KASPR Datahaus have tracked the impact of Hurricane Florence 2018, Cyclone Fani 2018, and Hurricane Laura in 2020.

Solar storms
Solar superstorms could cause large-scale global months-long Internet outages. A researchers describes potential mitigation measures and exceptions – such as user-powered mesh networks, related peer-to-peer applications and new protocols – and the robustness of the current Internet infrastructure.

Cyberattacks

Distributed Denial of Service (DDoS) attacks 
These attacks flood a website or network with traffic from multiple sources, overwhelming the server and making it unavailable to users.

Routing attacks 
These attacks target the infrastructure of the internet, specifically the routing systems that direct traffic between different networks. By manipulating or disrupting these systems, attackers can cause widespread outages.

Malware 
Malicious software can infect and damage computer systems and networks, leading to internet outages.

Botnets 
A botnet is a network of compromised computers that are controlled by an attacker. These computers can be used to launch DDoS attacks, spread malware, or perform other malicious actions that can cause internet outages.

Border Gateway Protocol (BGP) Hijacking 
Border Gateway Protocol (BGP) is used to route traffic on the internet. BGP hijacking is a form of cyber-attack where an attacker alters the routing information in BGP, causing internet traffic to be directed to the wrong place.

Accidents

Natural disasters 
Floods, hurricanes, earthquakes, and other natural disasters can damage internet infrastructure, causing outages.

Power failures 
Internet service providers (ISPs) rely on electricity to power their networks, so power failures can cause outages.

Human error 
Accidents caused by human error, such as a construction crew cutting through a fiber-optic cable, can cause internet outages.

Equipment failure 
The failure of equipment such as servers, routers, and switches can cause internet outages.

Maintenance 
Scheduled maintenance or unexpected repairs on the internet infrastructure can cause outages.

Weather condition 
Inclement weather such as heavy snow, thunderstorm, and heavy rain can cause outages by damaging the infrastructure or making it difficult for maintenance crews to access and repair the network.

Measurement 
A variety of organizations measure internet shutdowns including the Open Observatory of Network Interference, Access Now, Freedom House, the Digital Society Project (using the V-Dem Institute methodology and infrastructure), the OpenNet Initiative, the University of Michigan's Censored Planet Observatory, the Internet Censorship Lab, and the Monash IP Observatory.  These organizations use a range of methods to detect shutdowns such as expert analysis, remote sensing, and remote sensing with oversight. Some of these organizations, such as Access Now, maintain active lists of internet shutdowns.

Expert Analysis 
Several organizations use expert analysis to identify internet shutdowns.  Some, such as the Digital Society Project (DSP), send out surveys to experts around the world, and then aggregate the results into a single score.  For internet shutdowns, the DSP asks "How often does the government shut down domestic access to the Internet?" where answers range from "Extremely Often" to "Never or almost Never."  Freedom House's Freedom on the Net report also uses expert analysis to assess whether internet shutdowns have occurred, but instead of surveying multiple experts, Freedom House identifies and partners with a single expert to conduct an analysis.  Freedom House asks the question "Does the government intentionally disrupt the internet or cellphone networks in response to political or social events, whether temporary or long term, localized or nationwide?" Generally expert analyses are more prone to false positives and fewer false negatives (i.e. identifying shutdowns that other sources cannot confirm), than remote sensing methods with manual oversight.

Remote Sensing 
Other organizations use various remote sensing techniques to identify shutdowns.  Some organizations, such as the Open Observatory of Network Interference, the Internet Censorship Lab and the Monash IP-Observatory use automated remote sensing methods to detect internet shutdowns.  The Open Observatory of Network Interference uses software installed on computers of volunteers around the world to detect shutdowns.  However these methods are prone to false positives, false negatives, and various technical challenges.

In order to address these concerns, some organizations have implemented various methods of oversight.  Organizations such as Access Now and the OpenNet Initiative use such methods.  Access Now uses technological methods to detect shutdowns, but then confirms those shutdowns using news reports, reports from local activists, official government statements, and statements from ISPs.  The OpenNet Initiative has volunteers install software on their computers to check websites from access points around the world, then confirms those results with manual observations.  These methods are prone to more false negatives and fewer false positives (i.e. all shutdowns that these sources identify can be confirmed by other sources) than expert analyses.

A comparatively new method for detecting internet shutdowns is remote sensing with automated oversight.  These methods have been praised as more ethical and efficient as they do not endanger in-country volunteers.  However these methods have yet to produce regular datasets.

List

Prevention
Internet outages can be prevented by a more resilient, decentralized Internet architecture.

Management

Modern society, especially in developed countries, depends heavily on the Internet not just for communication. There have been some measures taken and possibilities exist for managing and countering a large-scale Internet outage.

Temporary alternative forms of communication

See also

References

External links
 The Internet could crash. We need a Plan B, TED talk by Danny Hillis
 Redecentralize.org

Internet architecture
Cyberwarfare